Baker's Wood is a hamlet 2 miles west of Denham (where at the 2011 Census the population was included) off the A40 in Buckinghamshire, England.

The hamlet has a private road designation and a residents' association, which looks after the interests of the residents, maintenance of verges (in trust) and the road.

References

Hamlets in Buckinghamshire